Rohini College of Engineering and Technology is an ISO-certified college located in Palkulam, Anjugramam, in the Indian state of Tamil Nadu. It is affiliated with Anna University, Chennai, approved by the All India Council for Technical Education.

Managing director 

Dr Neela Vishnu is the managing director of the college.

Governing council 
A governing council constituted as per AICTE guidelines consisting of individuals to guide the management in the developmental activities of the college and its future planning.

 Thiru. K. Neelamarthandan - chairman, Rohini College of Engineering & Technology
 Dr. N. Neela Vishnu - Managing Director, Rohini College of Engineering & Technology
 Dr. V.M. Blessy Geo - Chief Finance Officer, Rohini College of Engineering & Technology
 Dr. R. Rajesh - Principal, Rohini College of Engineering & Technology
 Dr. A. Ramanan - Scientific Officer, Tamil Nadu State Council for Science and Technology, DOTE Campus, Chennai
 Dr. N. Jawahar - Representing Educationist, Former Dean (Research & Development) Thiagarajar College of Engineering
 Dr. Jebakani - DOTE Nominee, Associate Professor, Government Engineering College, Tirunelveli
 Dr. S. Kalirajan - Representative of Industry, Vice President, L&T, Chennai
 Dr. K. Ganesh - Representative of Industry, Senior Knowledge Consultant, McKinsey India Ltd., Chennai
 Prof. P. Jeyakumar - Associate Professor & Vice-Principal Rohini College of Engineering & Technology

Scholarships

College 
 Students who score above the cutoff (180) in HSC are exempt from tuition fees.
 Meritorious students in the Anna University semester examinations are awarded cash prizes.

Government 
 Community scholarship- BC, MBC, SC/ST
 Minority scholarship
 Central Sector Scholarship
 Prime Minister Scholarship
 Merit cum Means Scholarship
 Minority of Labour Scholarship
 Pragathi Scholarship
 Ishan Uday-Special Scholarship

Programmes offered

Under Graduate (4 year degrees)
B.E.    Electrical and Electronics Engineering
B.E.    Computer Science and Engineering
B.E.    Electronics and Communication Engineering
B.E.    Mechanical Engineering
B.E     Civil Engineering

Post Graduate

M E Thermal engineering
M E CSE
M E Communication Systems
M E Construction Engineering and Management
M B A

References

External links 
 Official Website

 

Engineering colleges in Tamil Nadu
Private engineering colleges in Tamil Nadu
Colleges affiliated to Anna University
All India Council for Technical Education
Universities and colleges in Kanyakumari district
Educational institutions established in 2006
2006 establishments in Tamil Nadu
Educational institutions established in 2004